The American Elm cultivar Ulmus americana  'Incisa' was first described by Loudon in 1838 from a specimen in the Horticultural Society's Garden.

Description
The tree had "leaves somewhat more deeply serrated and rather smaller" than the type, Loudon likening them to those of Ulmus effusa.

Cultivation
The specimen in the Horticultural Society's Garden was 27 ft tall in 1834; Loudon considered it striking enough for a plate (Arboretum et fruticetum britannicum; Vol.II). No specimens are known to survive, though forms with deeply serrated leaves sometimes occur in the wild (see 'External links').

References

External links
 Leaves of an U. americana f. matching description of cultivar 'Incisa' (Iowa, 1956)
 

American elm cultivar
Ulmus
Missing elm cultivars